Acalypha ciliata is a species in the botanical family Euphorbiaceae. It occurs widely in Africa where it is eaten as a vegetable, or fed to animals. In West Africa and East Africa it is used as a medicinal plant.

Geographic distribution 
Acalypha ciliata occurs throughout tropical Africa, except central Africa. It also occurs in tropical Arabia, Pakistan, India and Sri Lanka.

References

External links 
PROTA4U on Acalypha ciliata

ciliata
Leaf vegetables
Plants used in traditional African medicine
Taxa named by Peter Forsskål